Rara is a form of festival music originating in Haiti.

Rara or RARA may also refer to:

Rara (grape), another name for the Italian wine grape Uva Rara
RaRa, abbreviated form of Revolutionaire Anti-Racistische Actie (Revolutionary Anti-Racist Action), Dutch terrorist organisation
Rara, Iran
Rara Lake, lake in Nepal
Rara, Nepal
Rara National Park, National Park in Nepal
rara.com, music streaming service
Retinoic acid receptor alpha, known as RARA or RAR-alpha
Opera Rara, British record label
12522 Rara, asteroid named after student prize-winner
Ra Ra Riot, an American indie rock band from Syracuse, New York
Rara (film), a 2016 Chilean film
Young Syefura Othman, Malaysian politician, nicknamed Rara

See also 
Rara avis (disambiguation)
Rah-rah (disambiguation)
"Bad Romance"

Note that the Latin word "rara", meaning "rare" is used as the second component in many plant or animal binomial names which are not listed on this page.